Strode's College is a sixth form college located in Egham, Surrey. It was founded in 1704, when Henry Strode bequeathed £6,000 to set up a free school in his native parish of Egham. In the twentieth century, Strode's became a boys' grammar school, before being designated a sixth form college in 1975. The college also provides a range of day and evening Adult Education courses. In September 2016, the college announced its intention to merge with East Berkshire College in February 2017. Alumni of the college are sometimes referred to as Old Strodians.

History
The college traces its origins to the free school founded by Henry Strode. This school and the Almshouses were built on the same site in Egham in 1706. The original buildings were pulled down. Of their replacements, built in 1828, two ranges of almshouses remain. Listed as historic buildings, they are still in use by the college. The present main college building dates from 1915. The school has been known previously as Strode's School and as Strode's Grammar School from 1919 until 1975, when it became Strode's College.

The Worshipful Company of Coopers
From the time of its foundation the Coopers' Company was the Trustee of Henry Strode's Charity, which administered the School but in 1912 the Charity Commissioners drafted a new Scheme which gave the School its own Board of Governors, changed it from an elementary to a secondary school and brought it into the Surrey education system. Under further changes introduced following the 1944 Education Act, the School was granted Voluntary Controlled status as a Boys' Grammar School and the composition of its Governing Body set to include four Foundation Trustees, one of whom, at least, was to be a representative of the company.

The Company continues to provide funds administered by the Foundation Trustees for the benefit of the college.

Notable former students
Susie Amy, actress
Paul Casey, professional golfer
Kirsty Capes, author
Colin Cramphorn, policeman 
Sir Roy Gardner, businessman
Adrian Genziani, Olympic rower
Gavin Greenaway, composer and conductor
Hard-Fi band members
Steve Lillywhite CBE, record producer (U2 etc.)
Doon Mackichan, actor and comedian
Aubrey Manning, zoologist and broadcaster
Dennis Pacey, footballer
Elyes Gabel, actor
Mark Stephens, CBE, lawyer and broadcaster
Timothy J. G. Harris, historian

External links
Strode's College Website
The Worshipful Company of Coopers

References

Sixth form colleges in Surrey